BSPP may refer to:

 BSPP (drug)
 British Society for Plant Pathology
 Burma Socialist Programme Party
 Paris Fire Brigade
 British standard parallel pipe thread, see British standard pipe thread